Everett Lewis Bradley (May 19, 1897 – July 25, 1969) was an American athlete. In 1920 he qualified for the 1920 Summer Olympics in pentathlon and decathlon; he competed only in the pentathlon and won a silver medal.

Bradley graduated in geology from the University of Kansas and later worked for an oil producing company, becoming a wealthy man.

References

1897 births
1969 deaths
American pentathletes
Olympic silver medalists for the United States in track and field
Athletes (track and field) at the 1920 Summer Olympics
Medalists at the 1920 Summer Olympics
American male decathletes